In computer security, virtual machine escape is the process of a program breaking out of the virtual machine on which it is running and interacting with the host operating system. A virtual machine is a "completely isolated guest operating system installation within a normal host operating system". In 2008, a vulnerability in VMware discovered by Core Security Technologies made VM escape possible on VMware Workstation 6.0.2 and 5.5.4. A fully working exploit labeled Cloudburst was developed by Immunity Inc. for Immunity CANVAS  (commercial penetration testing tool). Cloudburst was presented in Black Hat USA 2009.

Previous known vulnerabilities
 Xen pygrub: Command injection in grub.conf file.
 Directory traversal vulnerability in shared folders feature for VMware
 Directory traversal vulnerability in shared folders feature for VMware
 Xen Para Virtualized Frame Buffer backend buffer overflow.
 Cloudburst: VM display function in VMware
 QEMU-KVM: PIIX4 emulation does not check if a device is hotpluggable before unplugging
 The x86-64 kernel system-call functionality in Xen 4.1.2 and earlier
 Oracle VirtualBox 3D acceleration multiple memory corruption
 VENOM: buffer-overflow in QEMU's virtual floppy disk controller
 QEMU-KVM: Heap overflow in pcnet_receive function.
 Xen Hypervisor: Uncontrolled creation of large page mappings by PV guests
 Xen Hypervisor: The PV pagetable code has fast-paths for making updates to pre-existing pagetable entries, to skip expensive re-validation in safe cases (e.g. clearing only Access/Dirty bits).  The bits considered safe were too broad, and not actually safe.
 Xen Hypervisor:  Disallow L3 recursive pagetable for 32-bit PV guests
CVE-2017-5715, 2017-5753, 2017-5754: The Spectre and Meltdown hardware vulnerabilities, a cache side-channel attack on CPU level (Rogue Data Cache Load (RDCL)), allow a rogue process to read all memory of a computer, even outside the memory assigned to a virtual machine
 Hyper-V Remote Code Execution Vulnerability 
 Hyper-V Remote Code Execution Vulnerability
 VMware ESXi, Workstation, Fusion: SVGA driver contains buffer overflow that may allow guests to execute code on hosts
 VMware Workstation, Fusion: Heap buffer-overflow vulnerability in VMNAT device that may allow a guest to execute code on the host
 VMware Workstation, Horizon View : Multiple out-of-bounds read issues via Cortado ThinPrint may allow a guest to execute code or perform a Denial of Service on the Windows OS
 Oracle VirtualBox: shared memory interface by the VGA allows read and writes on the host OS
 VMware ESXi, Workstation, Fusion: Uninitialized stack memory usage in the vmxnet3 virtual network adapter.
: "Microarchitectural Data Sampling" (MDS) attacks: Similar to above Spectre and Meltdown attacks, this cache side-channel attack on CPU level allows to read data across VMs and even data of the host system. Sub types: Microarchitectural Store Buffer Data Sampling (MSBDS), Microarchitectural Fill Buffer Data Sampling (MFBDS) = Zombieload, Microarchitectural Load Port Data Sampling (MLPDS), and Microarchitectural Data Sampling Uncacheable Memory (MDSUM)
: Xen Hypervisor and Citrix Hypervisor: Allows guest virtual machines to compromise the host system (denial of service and rights escalation) 
 (critical), : Windows 10 and VMWare Workstation using AMD Radeon graphics cards using Adrenalin driver: attacker in guest system can use pixel shader to cause memory error on the host system, injecting malicious code to the host system and execute it.
: ZombieLoad, ZombieLoad v2, Vector Register Sampling (VRS), Microarchitectural Data Sampling (MDS), Transactional Asynchronous Abort (TAA), CacheOut, L1D Eviction Sampling (L1DES): L1 cache side attacks on CPU level allow virtual machines to read memory outside of their sandbox
CVE-2020-3962, CVE-2020-3963, CVE-2020-3964, CVE-2020-3965, CVE-2020-3966, CVE-2020-3967, CVE-2020-3968, CVE-2020-3969, CVE-2020-3970, CVE-2020-3971: VMware ESXi, Workstation Pro / Player, Fusion Pro, Cloud Foundation: Vulnerabilities in SVGA, graphics shader, USB driver, xHCI/EHCI, PVNVRAM, and vmxnet3 can cause virtual machine escape

See also
 Hyperjacking

References

External links
 
 Cloudburst (Hacking 3D And Breaking Out Of Vmware) Blackhat 2009 (Video)
 https://technet.microsoft.com/library/security/MS17-008 

Virtualization
Computer security exploits